Abdol Khakhi-ye Sofla (also Romanized as ʿAbdol Khākī-ye Soflá) is a village in Zamkan Rural District, in the Zamkan District of Salas-e Babajani County, Kermanshah Province, Iran. At the 2006 census, its population was 164, in 38 families.

References 

Populated places in Salas-e Babajani County